Nikica Valentić (born 24 November 1950) is a Croatian entrepreneur, lawyer and politician who served as Prime Minister of Croatia from 1993 to 1995. He is to date the youngest person to have served in that capacity, being 42 years old when taking office, and is also the first Croatian prime minister born after World War II. 

A native of Gospić, Valentić graduated from the Zagreb Faculty of Law. Before being involved in politics, he was a high-ranking official of INA, the Croatian oil company.

On 4 April 1993, as a member of the Croatian Democratic Union, he was appointed by the President Franjo Tuđman to the post of Prime Minister. He served in that position until 4 November 1995.

A few months after taking office his cabinet de-valued the Croatian currency Croatian dinar, stopping the inflation and bringing some sort of economic stability to Croatia for the first time after the start of war. In June 1994 the Croatian dinar was replaced with the kuna.

In 1995, during his term in office, the Croatian military and police conducted Operation Storm which would ultimately lead to the end of the war in Croatia and neighbouring Bosnia and Herzegovina. After his term expired, he served as a member of the Croatian Parliament until 2003.

See also
 Cabinet of Nikica Valentić

References

Prime Ministers of Croatia
Representatives in the modern Croatian Parliament
Croatian Democratic Union politicians
Faculty of Law, University of Zagreb alumni
People from Gospić
Living people
1950 births
Order of Ante Starčević recipients